Said Suwailim Al-Shoon (born 28 August 1983), commonly known as Said Al-Shoon, is an Omani football manager who is the current manager of Fanja SC U-23.

Club career
Said began his professional career in 1997 with Fanja SC. After spending two years with one of Oman's best football club, he moved to Muscat Club in 1999. During his time at the Muscat-based club (previously knows as Ruwi) he won various titles which include two Omani League title in the 2002-03 and 2005-06 seasons and a runners-up place in the 2003–04 season. He also helped his club win Oman's most prestigious tournament, the Sultan Qaboos Cup in 2003 and lead his team twice to the finals in 2004 and 2007.

After spending an illustrious part of his career with Muscat club for six years, he moved to Kuwait where he signed a six-months contract with Al-Nasr SC. His only goal in league-football came for Al-Nasr SC in the 2004–05 Kuwaiti Premier League season.

In the same season he moved to Qatar where he signed a contract with Al-Sailiya SC and helped them win the Qatar Second Division Cup in 2005. At the end of the 2005-06 season, he signed a contract with another Qatari club, Umm Salal SC.

In 2007, he came back to Oman and played for his former club Muscat club.

At the end of the 2007-08 season, he made a move to Saudi Arabia and signed a one-year contract with Al-Hazm FC. He scored his second club career goal for Al-Hazm FC in a 4-2 win over Saudi Arabian giants and champions of the 2008 King Cup of Champions Al-Shabab FC.

In 2008, he came back to Kuwait and signed a one-year contract with Kuwait's top club Kazma Sporting Club.

In 2009, he again came back to Saudi Arabia and signed a one-year contract with Al-Qadisiyah FC.

After spending a long five years spell with some of the top clubs in Kuwait, Qatar and Saudi Arabia he came back to Oman and signed a one-year contract with Al-Shabab Club. In 2011, he signed a contract with his former club Muscat club. After spending two seasons with the club where he spent his best times he announced that he would retire from professional football at the end of the 2012–13 Oman Elite League season.

Club career statistics

International career
Said has represented the Oman national football team from 2003 to 2011. He has made appearances in the 2004 AFC Asian Cup qualification, the 2004 AFC Asian Cup, the 2006 FIFA World Cup qualification, the 2007 AFC Asian Cup qualification, the 2007 AFC Asian Cup, the 2010 FIFA World Cup qualification and the 2011 AFC Asian Cup qualification. He announced his retirement from international football in 2011. He played his last match for Oman on 28 January 2009 in a 2011 AFC Asian Cup qualification match against Kuwait in which he came as a second-half substitute for Mohammed Al-Balushi and helped his side win the match 1-0.

Managerial career
Petre holds the AFC C License, the third highest football coaching qualification in Asian Football Confederation. He began his managerial career just a few months after retiring from club football in 2013. He first began managing the club with whom he began both his youth and professional career, Fanja U-19.

Honours

Club
With Fanja U-19
Gulf Youth Tournament (2): 1995, 1997

With Muscat
Omani League (2): 2002-03, 2005-06; Runners-up 2003–04
Sultan Qaboos Cup (1): 2003 (As Ruwi); Runners up 2004, 2007
Oman Super Cup (2): 2004, 2005

With Al-Sailiya
Qatar Second Division Cup (1): 2005

References

External links
 
 Said Al Shoon at Goal.com
 
 

1983 births
Living people
People from Muscat, Oman
Omani footballers
Oman international footballers
Omani expatriate footballers
Association football defenders
2004 AFC Asian Cup players
2007 AFC Asian Cup players
Al-Nasr SC (Salalah) players
Muscat Club players
Al-Nasr SC (Kuwait) players
Al-Sailiya SC players
Umm Salal SC players
Kazma SC players
Al-Hazem F.C. players
Al-Qadsiah FC players
Al-Shabab SC (Seeb) players
Qatar Stars League players
Saudi Professional League players
Expatriate footballers in Kuwait
Omani expatriate sportspeople in Kuwait
Expatriate footballers in Qatar
Omani expatriate sportspeople in Qatar
Expatriate footballers in Saudi Arabia
Omani expatriate sportspeople in Saudi Arabia
Omani football managers
Footballers at the 2002 Asian Games
Footballers at the 2006 Asian Games
Asian Games competitors for Oman
Kuwait Premier League players